Tom Nijssen (born 1 October 1964) is a former professional tennis player from the Netherlands. He went pro in 1984 and played at the ATP World Tour for 15 years. Nijssen's highest ATP singles ranking was No. 87 on 17 April 1989. He reached his best doubles ranking on 11 May 1992 when he became world No. 10. A doubles specialist, he won two Grand Slam mixed doubles titles with Manon Bollegraf, the French Open in 1989 and the US Open in 1991. They were runner-up at the Wimbledon mixed doubles tournament in 1993. In 1992 Nijssen and Helena Suková were the US Open mixed-doubles finalists.

Career finals

Doubles (11 titles, 14 runner-ups)

Doubles performance timeline

See also
List of Grand Slam Mixed Doubles champions

References

External links
 
 
 

1964 births
Dutch male tennis players
French Open champions
Hopman Cup competitors
Living people
Sportspeople from Maastricht
US Open (tennis) champions
Grand Slam (tennis) champions in mixed doubles